The Worcester station group is a station group of two railway stations in Worcester City Centre, England consisting of Foregate Street and Shrub Hill. The station group is printed on national rail tickets as WORCESTER STNS.

Stations
Worcester Foregate Street is Worcester's most central and most used station, located on Foregate Street. It is served by trains towards Birmingham via Kidderminster or Bromsgrove, Hereford via Malvern, London Paddington via Oxford, Bristol Temple Meads via Gloucester. The station is managed by London Midland and services are provided by London Midland and First Great Western.

Worcester Shrub Hill is Worcester's largest but least used station, located on the Shrub Hill Road about three quarters of a mile from the city centre. It is served by trains towards Birmingham via Kidderminster or Bromsgrove, Hereford via Malvern, London Paddington via Oxford, Bristol Temple Meads via Gloucester. The station is managed by London Midland and services are provided by London Midland and First Great Western. 

Although many services do serve both Worcester stations, some services will only serve one or the other station.

Connections

Tickets marked as WORCESTER STNS may be used to exit the railway network at any of the two city stations. Both stations are directly connected by train services and are about three quarters of a mile from each other.

References

External links
Station information for Worcester Foregate Street from West Midlands Railway
Station information for Worcester Shrub Hill from West Midlands Railway

Transport in Worcester, England